Reuben Stanley Henderson, D.O. (born October 3, 1958) is a former professional American football player who played cornerback for four seasons for the Chicago Bears and the San Diego Chargers. Dr. Henderson is now a practicing physician, specializing in physiatry.

Personal life
Reuben Henderson was born in Santa Monica, California. He attended Fontana High School in Fontana, California, graduating in 1976. He then attended Oklahoma State University and San Diego State University.

Football
After a standout career at Fontana High School, culminating in a CIF championship game in 1976, Henderson then joined the football program at Oklahoma State University. He later finished his college football career at San Diego State University.
Henderson was drafted by the Chicago Bears in the 6th round in 1981. He played two years in Chicago, before being traded to the San Diego Chargers. After two years with the Chargers, Henderson retired from professional football.

After football
After his professional football career ended in 1984, Henderson enrolled in medical school at Michigan State University College of Osteopathic Medicine, where he graduated "best clinical student" in the class of 1993 with a Doctor of Osteopathic Medicine degree. He completed a physical medicine and rehabilitation (PM&R) residency in the University of Michigan Health System. He currently operates a PM&R private practice in Lansing, Michigan.

References

1958 births
Living people
Players of American football from Santa Monica, California
American football cornerbacks
San Diego State Aztecs football players
Chicago Bears players
San Diego Chargers players
American osteopathic physicians